The Time Being is a 2012 American mystery film directed by Nenad Cicin-Sain, written by Nenad Cicin-Sain and Richard N. Gladstein, and starring Wes Bentley, Frank Langella, Ahna O'Reilly, Sarah Paulson, Corey Stoll and Gina Gallego. It was released on July 23, 2013, by Tribeca Film.

Cast
Wes Bentley as Daniel
Frank Langella as Warner Dax
Ahna O'Reilly as Olivia
Sarah Paulson as Sarah
Corey Stoll as Eric
Gina Gallego as Anjelica
Jeremy Allen White as Gus
Mila Brener as Winona
Aiden Lovekamp as Marco
Ivan Shaw as Officer
Sandra Seacat as Annette
Megan Kuhlmann as Nurse
Thurn Hoffman as Henry

Release
The film premiered at the 2012 Toronto International Film Festival on September 11, 2012. The film was released on July 23, 2013, by Tribeca Film.

References

External links
 
 

2012 films
2010s mystery films
American mystery films
2010s English-language films
2010s American films